Cracks can be formed in many different elastomers by ozone attack, and the characteristic form of attack of vulnerable rubbers is known as ozone cracking. The problem was formerly very common, especially in tires, but is now rarely seen in those products owing to preventive measures. 

However, it does occur in many other safety-critical items such as fuel lines and rubber seals, such as gaskets and O-rings, where ozone attack is considered unlikely. Only a trace amount of the gas is needed to initiate cracking, and so these items can also succumb to the problem.

Susceptible elastomers

Tiny traces of ozone in the air will attack double bonds in rubber chains, with natural rubber, polybutadiene, styrene-butadiene rubber and nitrile rubber being most sensitive to degradation. Every repeat unit in the first three materials has a double bond, so every unit can be degraded by ozone. Nitrile rubber is a copolymer of butadiene and acrylonitrile units, but the proportion of acrylonitrile is usually lower than butadiene, so attack occurs. Butyl rubber is more resistant but still has a small number of double bonds in its chains, so attack is possible. Exposed surfaces are attacked first, the density of cracks varying with ozone gas concentration. The higher the concentration, the greater the number of cracks formed. 

Ozone-resistant elastomers include EPDM, fluoroelastomers like Viton and polychloroprene rubbers like Neoprene. Attack is less likely because double bonds form a very small proportion of the chains, and with the latter, the chlorination reduces the electron density in the double bonds, therefore lowering their propensity to react with ozone. Silicone rubber, Hypalon and polyurethanes are also ozone-resistant.

Form of cracking

Ozone cracks form in products under tension, but the critical strain is very small. The cracks are always oriented at right angles to the strain axis, so will form around the circumference in a rubber tube bent over. Such cracks are very dangerous when they occur in fuel pipes because the cracks will grow from the outside exposed surfaces into the bore of the pipe, so fuel leakage and fire may follow. 
Seals are also susceptible to attack, such as diaphragm seals in air lines. Such seals are often critical for the operation of pneumatic controls, and if a crack penetrates the seal, all functions of the system can be lost. Nitrile rubber seals are commonly used in pneumatic systems because of its oil resistance. However, if ozone gas is present, cracking will occur in the seals unless preventative measures are taken.

Ozone attack will occur at the most sensitive zones in a seal, especially sharp corners where the strain is greatest when the seal is flexing in use. The corners represent stress concentrations, so the tension is at a maximum when the diaphragm of the seal is bent under air pressure.

The seal shown at left failed from traces of ozone at circa 1 ppm, and once cracking had started, it continued as long as the gas was present. This particular failure led to loss of production on a semi-conductor fabrication line. The problem was solved by adding effective filters in the air line and by modifying the design to eliminate the very sharp corners. An ozone-resistant elastomer such as Viton was also considered as a replacement for the Nitrile rubber. The pictures were taken using ESEM for maximum resolution.

Ozonolysis
The reaction occurring between double bonds and ozone is known as ozonolysis when one molecule of the gas reacts with the double bond:

The immediate result is formation of an ozonide, which then decomposes rapidly so that the double bond is cleaved. This is the critical step in chain breakage when polymers are attacked. The strength of polymers depends on the chain molecular weight or degree of polymerization, the higher the chain length, the greater the mechanical strength (such as tensile strength). By cleaving the chain, the molecular weight drops rapidly and there comes a point when it has little strength whatsoever, and a crack forms. Further attack occurs in the freshly exposed crack surfaces and the crack grows steadily until it completes a circuit and the product separates or fails. In the case of a seal or a tube, failure occurs when the wall of the device is penetrated.

The carbonyl end groups which are formed are usually aldehydes or ketones, which can oxidise further to carboxylic acids. The net result is a high concentration of elemental oxygen on the crack surfaces, which can be detected using Energy-dispersive X-ray spectroscopy in the environmental SEM, or ESEM. The spectrum at left shows the high oxygen peak compared with a constant sulfur peak. The spectrum at right shows the unaffected elastomer surface spectrum, with a relatively low oxygen peak compared with the sulfur peak.

Prevention

The problem can be prevented by adding antiozonants to the rubber before vulcanization. Ozone cracks were commonly seen in automobile tire sidewalls, but are now seen rarely thanks to the use of these additives. A common and low cost antiozonant is a wax which bleeds to the surface and forms a protective layer, but other specialist chemicals are also widely used. 

On the other hand, the problem does recur in unprotected products such as rubber tubing and seals, where ozone attack is thought to be impossible. Unfortunately, traces of ozone can turn up in the most unexpected situations. Using ozone-resistant rubbers is another way of inhibiting cracking. EPDM rubber and butyl rubber are ozone resistant, for example.

For high value equipment where loss of function can cause serious problems, low cost seals may be replaced at frequent intervals so as to preclude failure.  

Ozone gas is produced during electric discharge by sparking or corona discharge for example. Static electricity can build up within machines like compressors with moving parts constructed from insulating materials. If those compressors feed pressurised air into a closed pneumatic system, then all seals in the system may be at risk from ozone cracking.

Ozone is also produced by the action of sunlight on volatile organic compounds or VOCs, such as gasoline vapour present in the air of towns and cities, in a problem known as photochemical smog. The ozone formed can drift many miles before it is destroyed by further reactions.

Use of rubber bands to test for ozone pollution

Rubber bands have been used in at least publicized home experiment to allow for global testing of ozone pollution. Titled GORP, for Global Ozone Rubber Participant, users can see the effects of ozone pollution near their own homes or places of employment. Rubber bands were chosen due to their availability and low cost. In the experiment, two rubber bands are used to each suspend two small water bottles. One is suspended outdoors, protected from the sun and rain, and one indoors. A data recording sheet is placed behind the setup and taped to a wall. The user then marks the changes in the height of the water bottles as the natural rubber degrades from ozone pollution. Since both water bottles are nearly the same mass, the force on each rubber band is similar, and the spring constant of each rubber band is compared via ratio of the water bottle relative extensions on the rubber bands. Typically, the home experimenter sees relatively little damage to the indoor control compared to the outdoor setup. After a week or two, the home experimenters seal both rubber bands into a small plastic bag and mail them, along with their data sheets to the GORP researchers. Researchers examine loss of elasticity versus data and location. The GORP study was originally implemented during the SARS-CoV-2 pandemic as a means to test for reduced ozone pollution during the quarantine.

See also

Applied spectroscopy
Brittleness
Corona discharge
Corrosion
Electrostatic discharge
Forensic chemistry
Forensic engineering
Forensic materials engineering
Forensic polymer engineering
Ozonolysis
Polymer degradation
Stress corrosion cracking

References

Lewis, Peter Rhys, Reynolds, K, Gagg, C, Forensic Materials Engineering: Case studies, CRC Press (2004).
Lewis, Peter Rhys Forensic Polymer Engineering: Why polymer products fail in service, 2nd edition, Woodhead/Elsevier (2016).

Polymers
Corrosion
Elastomers
Polymer chemistry
Tires
Forensic phenomena
Materials degradation
Rubber properties